Kadkhodalu-ye Pain (also Romanized as Kadkhodālū-ye Pā’īn; also known as Hāshemābād) is a village in Bastamlu Rural District, in the Central District of Khoda Afarin County, East Azerbaijan Province, Iran. At the 2006 census, its population was 40, in 8 families.

References 

Populated places in Khoda Afarin County